Massaro House is a residence inspired by famed architect Frank Lloyd Wright on privately owned Petre Island in Lake Mahopac, New York, roughly 50 miles north of New York city. The design and construction of the house has a complex history, due to the involvement Wright and its high cost. It was initially known as the "Chahroudi House", for the client who commissioned it, but after its completion in 2007 attained the name of the man who bought the designs and funded the construcion, Joseph Massaro. The association of Wright with the residence has been legally disputed by Frank Lloyd Wright Foundation.

Brad Pitt received the mansion and the small island it is on as a $15 million dollar gift from Angelina Jolie for his 50th birthday.

Concept
In 1949, architect Frank Lloyd Wright received a commission from Ahmed Chahroudi to build a house on a  island the engineer owned in Lake Mahopac, Petre (historically spelled "Petra", from the Latin for "rock", reflecting the prominence where the home was to be constructed). Chahroudi would later state that during a lunch meeting with Wright and Edgar Kaufmann, the owner of Wright's celebrated Fallingwater, the architect told Kaufmann: "When I finish the house on the island, it will surpass your Fallingwater".

Wright worked on designing a one-story,  house for three months, but the project was cancelled when Chahroudi realized he would not be able to afford either the $50,000 budget that Wright envisioned for the project or a second more modest version he requested. Instead, he had Wright build a three bedroom  guest cottage the architect had designed for the island (today known as the A. K. Chahroudi Cottage), later occupying it with his family as a summer retreat.

Design
In 1996, Petre Island was purchased for US$700,000 by Joseph Massaro, a sheet metal contractor. Though he had seen the original Chahroudi commission drawings for the main home years earlier, he initially intended merely to restore the island's Wright-designed guest cottage.

Those drawings– a floor plan with ideas for built-in and stand-alone furniture, a building section, and three elevations–were included in his acquisition of the island. He hired Thomas A. Heinz, an architect and Wright historian, to complete the only partially realized design.

Heinz employed Archicad Building Information Modeling (BIM) software to model aspects of Wright's design not self-evident in the original renderings.  His design also provided updated heating and cooling solutions such as air conditioning and radiant heating that were not part of the original Wright concept. The design as built features chimney caps — to which Wright characteristically took exception —  at each of the home's six fireplaces.

In common with Fallingwater, the house's design does not merely accommodate but actually incorporates the local topography. A -high, -long rock forms the exterior to the entry and an interior wall, while a smaller rock doubles as a kitchen and bathroom wall. Again, like Fallingwater's signature terraces, the house features a cantilevered deck that stretches  over Lake Mahopac.  Its -high living area is illuminated with 26 triangular skylights.

Massaro sold his sheet metal business in 2000 to focus on building the house. The project was completed in 2007 and included adaptations to Wright's original plans to increase the concrete's structural stability and to comply with modern building codes.

Controversy

Copyright claim
Throughout the construction, Massaro was in conflict with the Frank Lloyd Wright Foundation, which had been established by the architect in 1940 to conserve his intellectual property. The foundation claimed copyright over Wright's design documents and requested $450,000 to render working drawings from Wright's sketches and supervise construction of the house. Instead, Massaro hired Heinz and the foundation filed a lawsuit, which ended in a settlement that limited Massaro to referring to the structure as being "inspired by Frank Lloyd Wright".

The foundation refuses to recognize Massaro House as an authentic Frank Lloyd Wright creation on a number of aesthetic and construction grounds beyond Massaro's refusal to comply with certification.  Massaro countered that he believed that Wright would rather the house be built than not built at all.

Criticism of design
Rejection of the house by critics as a Wright design extends beyond the architectural supervision and fees, and includes details of the Massaro House construction. Notably, William Allin Storrer, an adjunct professor of architecture and Wright historian, points to the desert masonry and skylight selection. Additionally, the quality of the roof fascia and a set of missing stairs descending from the cantilevered deck to the shore below that was included in the original design are highlighted as contentious details that should remove the house from consideration as a Wright design.

Storrer pointed out that rocks used in the desert masonry project out from the concrete surface on the Massaro House. Wright's signature desert masonry embedded native rocks closely in concrete. In his designs, Storrer claimed, rocks are flush with the face of the concrete, rather than distinct from one-another and randomly applied to otherwise finished walls protruding at odd angles. Evading the aesthetic consequence of design choices made, Massaro countered that  of Styrofoam insulation had to be added in order to adhere to modern building codes, resulting in the stones projecting beyond the original dimensions. He claimed that it was a concession even Wright would have been forced to make. As rendered, that claim is untenable.

Another signature of Wright's designs is the use of many windows, with the Heinz design for Massaro House including 26 skylights. The skylights chosen and installed in the home are domed, rather than the typically flat Wright designed panels. Massaro pointed out that flat panels are shown to leak, which Storrer conceded is a known issue with Wright designs but countered that solutions exist that would have allowed Massaro to stay true to "Wrightian" design principles.

Homes designed by Wright often incorporate a unique design in the fascia or window frames. To stamp the custom design into the copper to be used for the fascia on the roof, Massaro created a special machine. Wright defenders insist that the design is stamped too lightly and shallowly to satisfy Wright's design standards.

Several of Wright's design drawings for Chahroudi include a set of stairs that descend from the cantilevered deck to the rocky shore below, a motif borrowed from Fallingwater, where they descend to the stream that home is built upon, Bear Run. Massaro explained that had the stairs been included in his design they would have descended into  of water, disregarding that the flight could have been shortened to accommodate.

Status
The Massaro House is maintained as a private residence and is not open for the general public. However, Massaro has stated he would make the house available as a fundraising location for nonprofit charitable groups.

In November 2012 the property was listed for sale at US$20 million, sold for $15 million in 2013 and then listed again for sale having an approximately $10 million price tag in 2021.

References

Houses completed in 2007
Frank Lloyd Wright buildings
Houses in Putnam County, New York